Charles Drake may refer to:

 Charles Drake (actor) (1917–1994), American actor
 Charles D. Drake (1811–1892), United States Senator
 Charles George Drake (1920–1998), Canadian neurosurgeon
 Charlie Drake (1925–2006), English comedian, actor and singer
 Charles Drake (American football) (1981–2012), American football safety
 Charles Bryant Drake (1872–1956), American general
 Charles C. Drake (1887–1984), American general
 Charles L. Drake (1924–1997), American geologist